Malta does not have any permanent rivers, but does have numerous wadis (Wied in Maltese), which is an either permanently or intermittently dry riverbed. This is a list of wadis, and their accompanying valleys in Malta, arranged by locality.  Wadis or valleys that cross more than one locality are listed in all that they cross.

Attard
Wied Inċita (Inċita Valley)
Wied is-Sewda (Black Valley) 
Wied San Martin (St. Martin's Valley)
Wied ta' Ċampra (Ċampra Valley)
Wied ta' Ħemsija (Ħemsija Valley)
Wied ta' Rmiedi (Rmiedi Valley)

Balzan
Wied Ħal-Balzan (Balzan Valley)

Bidnija
Wied Qannotta (Qannotta Valley)
Wied l-Arkata (Arch Valley)
Wied tal-Ħżejjen (Badest Valley)
Wied tal-Pwales (Pwales Valley)
Ras il-Wied (The Valley's Point)
Wied tal-Imsellit (Msellit Valley)
Wied Għajn Mula (Mula Spring Valley)
Wied Għajn Riħana (Riħana Spring Valley)
Wied Ċelestina (Celest Valley)

Birkirkara
Wied is-Sewda (Sewda Valley)
Wied ta' Birkirkara (Birkirkara Valley) or Tal-Wejter Valley
Wied ta' l-Imsida (Msida Valley)

Birżebbuġa
Wied Dalam (Dalam Valley) - Għar Dalam
Wied Ħas-Saptan (Saptan Valley)
Wied il-Buni (Buni Valley)  
Wied il-Qoton (Coton Valley) 
Wied ix-Xoqqa (Linen Valley) 
Wied tal-Klima (Climate Valley) 
Wied Żembaq (Żembaq Valley)
Wied Żnuber (Fir Valley)

Dingli

Wied Ħażrun (Hazrun Valley)
Wied il-Bużbież (Fennel Valley)
Wied Liemu (Liemu Valley)

Comino
Wied l-Aħmar (The Red Valley)
Wied Ta' Bieqa (Ta' Bieqa Valley)

Fgura
Wied Blandun (Blandun Valley)

Fontana
Wied Siekel (Siekel Valley) 
Wied tal-Lunzjata (Lunzjata Valley)

Għajnsielem
Wied ir-Rajjes (Rajjes Valley) 
Wied Martin (Martin Valley) 
Wied tal-Imġarr (Mġarr Valley)

Għargħur
Wied Anġlu (Angel Valley) 
Wied Santa Marija taż-Żellieqa (St. Mary of Zellieqa Valley) 
Wied id-Dis (Madliena Valley / Gharghur Valley)
Wied id-Dib (Wolf's Valley)
Wied Faħam (Coal Valley)
Wied ta' Piswella (Piswella Valley)
Wied ta' Santa Katerina (St. Catherine's Valley)

Għasri
Wied is-Seqer (Seqer Valley)
Wied l-Għasri (Għasri Valley) 
Wied Sara (Sara Valley)
Wied tal-Ort (Garden Valley) 
Wied tal-Qattus (Cat Valley)

Għaxaq
Wied Dalam (Dalam Valley)
Wied Ħas-Saptan (Saptan Valley)

Gudja
Wied Betti

Gżira
Wied il-Kappara (Kappara Valley)

Iklin
Wied tal-Iklin (Iklin Valley)

Kalkara
Wied Għammieq (Għammieq Valley) 
Wied ta' Rnella (Rinella Valley)

Kerċem
Wied il-Ġifna (Ġifna Valley) 
Wied il-Ħmar (Donkey Valley) 
Wied Mans (Mans Valley) 
Wied tal-Grixti (Grixti Valley) 
Wied tal-Lunzjata (Lunzjata Valley)

Lija
Wied Ħal-Lija (Lija Valley)

Luqa
Wied Betti (Betti Valley) 
Wied il-Kbir (Grand Valley) 
Wied il-Knejjes (Churches Valley) 
Wied in-Noqor (Noqor Valley)

Marsa
Wied il-Ġonna (Gardens Valley)

Marsaskala
Wied il-Għajn (Spring's Valley)
Wied iz-Ziju (Uncle's Valley)

Marsaxlokk

Wied ta' Marsaxlokk

Mdina
Wied il-Ħemsija (Hemsija Valley)
Wied ta' Ġnien Ħira (Ħira Garden Valley)

Mellieħa
Wied Għarbiel (Net Valley)
Wied l-Abjad (White Valley)
Wied Musa (Musa Valley)
Wied ta' Għajn Żejtuna (Olive Spring Valley)
Wied ta' Rdum (Cliffs Valley)
Wied ta' Ruman (Roman Valley)
Wied tal-Ħanżira (Pig Valley)
Wied tal-Kalkara (Kalkara Valley)
Wied tal-Mellieħa (Mellieħa Valley)

Mġarr
Ras il-Wied 
Wied Ħalqun
Wied il-Ħmir (Donkeys' Valley)
Wied ta' Binġemma (Binġemma Valley)
Wied tal-Imsellit (Msellit Valley) 
Wied tal-Ġnejna (Ġnejna Valley)
Wied tas-Santi (Santi Valley)
Wied taż-Żebbiegħ (Żebbiegħ Valley)

Mosta
Wied il-Qliegħa (Qlejja Valley)
Wied il-Ħanżira (Pig Valley)
Wied tal-Isperanza (Speranza Valley)
Wied is-Sir (Sir Valley) 
Wied il-Għasel (Honey Valley)
Wied Filep (Filpe Valley) - Demolished to make space for a stone quarry
Wied Gananu (Gananu Valley)

All of the above form the Mosta Valley.

Msida
Wied Għollieqa (Għollieqa Valley) 
Wied tal-Imsida (Msida Valley)

Munxar
Wied is-Saqwi (Saqwi Valley) 
Wied ix-Xlendi (Xlendi Valley) 
Wied l-Għawdxija (Gozotin Woman's Valley) 
Wied tal-Kantra (Kantra Valley)

Nadur
Wied Binġemma (Binġemma Valley)
Wied ir-Riħan (Riħan Valley) 
Wied San Blas (San Blas Valley)
Wied ta' Kusbejja (Kusbejja Valley)

Naxxar
Wied Anġlu (Angel Valley) 
Wied Bordi (Bordi Valley) 
Wied Filep (Philep Valley) 
Wied il-Faħam (Coals Valley)
Wied il-Għasel (Honey Valley)
Wied Ta' Kieli  (Kieli's Valley)

Qala
Wied Biljun (Bilion Valley) 
Wied Simar (Simar Valley)
Wied tal-Blata (Rock's Valley)

Qormi
Wied iċ-Ċawsli (Mulberry Valley) 
Wied il-Kbir (Grand Valley) 
Wied is-Sewda (Black  Valley)

Qrendi
Wied Ħoxt (Ħoxt Valley)
Wied iż-Żurrieq (Żurrieq Valley)

Rabat, Gozo
Wied Beżżum Baw (Bezzum Baw Valley) 
Wied is-Seqer (Seqer Valley) 
Wied Karawendi (Karawendi Valley) 
Wied Sara (Sara Valley) 
Wied ta' Żieta (Ta' Żieta Valley) 
Wied taċ-Ċjanti (Ċjanti Valley) 
Wied tal-Belliegħa (Belliegħa Valley)
Wied tal-Grazzja (Grazzia Valley) 
Wied tal-Kapuċċini (Capuchins Valley)
Wied tal-Lunzjata (Lunzjata Valley)

Rabat, Malta
Wied il-Gerżuma (Gerzuma Valley) 
Wied Ħażrun (Hazrun Valley)
Wied il-Baħrija (Baħrija Valley)
Wied il-Bużbież (Fennel Valley) 
Wied il-Fiddien (Fiddien Valley) 
Wied il-Qliegħa (Chadwick Lakes) 
Wied iż-Żebbuġ (Olives Valley) 
Wied tal-Armla (Widow's Valley)
Wied tal-Isqof (Bishop Valley) 
Wied Liemu (Liemu Valley) 
Wied Rini (Rini Valley) 
Wied Sant' Antnin (St. Anthony Valley) 
Wied Santi (Santi Valley)  
Wied Tal-Marġa (Marga Valley)

San Ġiljan
Wied Għomor (Għomor Valley) 
Wied Ħarq Ħamiem (Harq Hamiem Valley) 
Wied ta' Kalċi (Kalċi Valley)
Wied tal-Balluta (Balluta Valley)

San Ġwann
Wied Għollieqa (Għollieqa Valley) 
Wied Għomor (Għomor Valley)

San Pawl il-Baħar
Wied Bufula (Warbler Valley)
Wied Qannotta (Qannotta Valley) 
Wied Sardin (Sardine Valley)
Wied ta' Għajn Riħana (Għajn Riħana Valley)
Wied ta' Sejkla (Sejkla Valley)
Wied tal-Ħżejjen (Baddest Valley)
Wied tal-Mistra (Mistra Valley)
Wied tal-Pwales (Pwales Valley)

San Lawrenz
Wied Ġuno (Juno Valley)
Wied il-Kbir (Main Valley) 
Wied Merill (Merill Valley)
Wied tal-Knisja (Church Valley)

Santa Luċija
Wied Ta' Garnaw (Ta' Garnaw Valley)

Siġġiewi
Wied Costa (Costa Valley)
Wied il-Girgenti (Girgenti Valley) 
Wied Ħesri (Hesri Valley)
Wied il-Luq (Luq Valley)
Wied ix-Xagħri 
Wied Musa
Wied ta' Manduca (Manduca Valley)
Wied ta' San Antnin (St. Anthony's Valley) 
Wied Xkora (Sack Valley)

Swieqi
Wied Għomor (Għomor Valley) 
Wied id-Dis (Dis Valley)
Wied il-Kbir tas-Swieqi (Swieqi Grand Valley) 
Wied Mejxu (Mejxu Valley)

Xagħra
Wied Bażżum Baw (Bazzum Baw Valley)
Wied tal-Egħżien (Egħżien Valley) 
Wied tal-Għejun (Springs Valley)

Xewkija
Wied Imġarr ix-Xini (Mġarr ix-Xini Valley)

Xgħajra
Wied Glavan (Glavan Valley)

Żabbar
Wied Ta' Mazza (Mazza Valley)

Żebbuġ, Gozo
Wied l-Abjad (White Valley) 
Wied il-Qbajjar (Qbajjar Valley)
Wied l-Infern (Infern Valley) 
Wied tal-Inżit (Nżit Valley) 
Wied ta' Marsalforn (Marsalforn Valley) 
Wied tal-Qliegħa (Qliegħa Valley)

Żebbuġ, Malta
Wied Ħesri (Ħesri Valley)
Wied Inċita (Incita Valley) 
Wied il-Mofru (Mofru Valley)
Wied is-Sewda (Sewda Valley) 
Wied Qirda (Qirda Valley) 
Wied ta' Baqqiegħa (Baqqiegħa Valley)
Wied ta' Ħal Mula (Mula Valley)
Wied ta' San Martin (St. Martin Valley)
Wied tat-Troll (Troll Valley)

Żejtun
Ħajt il-Wied 
Wied tal-Kotob (Kotob Valley) 
Wied iż-Żiju (Żiju Valley)
Wied iż-Żrinġ (Frog's Valley)

Żurrieq
Wied Babu (Babu Valley) 
Wied Ganu (Ganu Valley) 
Wied il-Fulija (Fulija Valley)
Wied il-Qoton (Cotton Valley)
Wied iż-Żurrieq (Żurrieq Valley) 
Wied Maqbul (Maqbul Valley) 
Wied Moqbol (Moqbol Valley)

References

Valleys

Malta